Per Carl Gustav Unckel (24 February 1948 – 20 September 2011) was a Swedish Moderate Party politician who served as Minister for Education from 1991 to 1994 and as Governor of Stockholm County from 2007 until his death in 2011.

He was born in Östergötland and was at one time chairman of the Moderate Youth League district there. He studied law in Uppsala 1968–71. In 1971, he was elected national chairman of the Moderate Youth League and served until 1976, when he was elected to the Riksdag for Östergötland.

In 1986, he became secretary general of the Moderate Party. He stayed in the post until 1991, when the Moderate Party won the election and Carl Bildt became Prime Minister of Sweden. Unckel was then appointed Minister of Education. In that position, he spearheaded the educational reforms that revolutionised the Swedish education system. Among other things, students were allowed to choose among the local schools.

After the loss in the election in 1994, Unckel became the party spokesman on labour policy. In 1998 he became chairman of the Committee on the Constitution and one year later he was appointed leader of the Moderate Party parliamentary group.

The election in 2002 was disastrous for the Moderate Party and several senior figures had to resign from the board of the party. Per Unckel was one of them. He was seen as a part of the old regime - the so-called "Bunker" around Carl Bildt, together with the likes of Anders Björk and Gunnar Hökmark. His old Moderate Youth League district, however, paid their respects by electing him honorary chairman. In 2003, he was appointed secretary-general of the Nordic Council of Ministers and retired from Swedish politics. He served until December 2006. He later served as the Chairman of the Governing Board of the European Humanities University. 

Unckel died on 20 September 2011 from cancer, aged 63.

References

External links

1948 births
2011 deaths
Swedish Ministers for Education
Members of the Riksdag from the Moderate Party
Governors of Stockholm County
Uppsala University alumni
Recipients of the Order of the Cross of Terra Mariana, 2nd Class
Deaths from cancer in Sweden
Members of the Riksdag 1976–1979
Members of the Riksdag 1979–1982
Members of the Riksdag 1982–1985
Members of the Riksdag 1994–1998
Members of the Riksdag 1998–2002
Members of the Riksdag 2002–2006
Burials at Galärvarvskyrkogården